Anıl Aydın (born 10 January 2000) is a German-Turkish professional footballer who plays as an attacking midfielder for 1. FC Kaiserslautern.

Career
Aydın played for the youth teams of VfL Leverkusen, Bayer Leverkusen, Viktoria Köln and 1. FC Köln, before joining 1. FC Kaiserslautern in 2019, beginning with the second team. He made his professional debut for Kaiserslautern's senior team in the 3. Liga on 9 January 2021, starting in the home match against former club Viktoria Köln. He was substituted out in the 65th minute for Hendrick Zuck, with the match finishing as a 0–0 draw.

Personal life
Aydın's older brother, Okan Aydın, is also a professional footballer.

References

External links
 
 
 

2000 births
Living people
Sportspeople from Aachen
Footballers from North Rhine-Westphalia
German footballers
Turkish footballers
German people of Turkish descent
Association football midfielders
1. FC Kaiserslautern II players
1. FC Kaiserslautern players
3. Liga players